1935 in professional wrestling describes the year's events in the world of professional wrestling.

List of notable promotions 
Only one promotion held notable shows in 1935.

Calendar of notable shows

Championship changes

EMLL

Debuts
Debut date uncertain:
Angelo Savoldi
Freddie Blassie
Vince McMahon Sr.
February 26  Frank Stojack

Births
Date of birth uncertain:
Chief Little Eagle (died in 1990) 
January 14  Guillotine Gordon 
January 21  Jack Tunney(died in 2004)
February 2  Dory Dixon
March 16  Lorenzo Parente (died in 2014) 
March 22  Hisashi Shinma 
May 5  Billy Two Rivers (died in 20230
May 6  Ted Lewin (died in 2021) 
May 14  Ethel Johnson (wrestler) (died in 2018) 
May 27  Tarzan Taborda (died in 2005) 
June 5  Rickin Sánchez (died in 2023) 
June 9  Dutch Savage (died in 2013) 
July 2  Whitey Caldwell(died in 1972)
July 6  Moose Morowski (died in 2016) 
July 7  Smasher Sloan (died in 2001) 
July 15  Tony Charles(died in 2015) 
July 15  Alex Karras (died in 2012) 
July 21  Nelson Royal (died in 2002)
July 28  Luke Brown(died in 1997)
August 21  Judy Grable (died in 2008)
August 31  Bearcat Brown(died in 1996)
September 5  Ray Stevens (wrestler)(died in 1996)
September 29  Horst Hoffman 
October 6  Bruno Sammartino(died in 2018)
October 14  Jack Lanza(died in 2021)
October 24  Paul Diamond (Paul Lehman) 
November 1  Yukiko Tomoe 
November 17  Johnny Weaver(died in 2008)
November 28  Earl Maynard
December 13  Hogan Wharton (died in 2008) 
December 25  Woody Farmer (died in 2012)

References

 
professional wrestling